The 1982 San Francisco 49ers season was the franchise's 33rd season in the National Football League and their 37th overall. The team was coming off a Super Bowl victory over the Cincinnati Bengals. However, 1982 was strike-shortened, and only nine games were played. The 49ers finished 3–6, thus missing the playoffs despite the expanded sixteen team format. Their .333 winning percentage was the worst ever for any defending NFL or AFL champion until the 2022 Los Angeles Rams, who only managed to get a .294 winning percentage. This season was the only one in an 18-season span in which the 49ers did not win at least ten games. This 49ers team was also the only team in history to win more than half its road games while losing all its home games. The 49ers were the fifth team in NFL history to enter a season as the defending Super Bowl champion and miss the playoffs.

The worst running game in the league alongside a defense that went from second overall and points in 1981 to twenty-first and twenty-third respectively were the main culprits for the losing season.

Personnel

Staff

Roster

Regular season

Schedule

Game summaries

Week 1

Week 2

Week 3

Standings

References 

San Francisco 49ers seasons
San Francisco
1982 in San Francisco
San